TopTen is an Estonian record label which has started the career of a number of successful Baltic chart acts, including the internationally successful girl group Vanilla Ninja, who are currently the label's most successful act.

See also
Lists of record labels

References

External links
 

Estonian record labels
Pop record labels